Edward Kevin "Mickey" Murray (October 14, 1898 – March 21, 1978) was a Canadian  professional ice hockey goaltender who played in one National Hockey League game for the Montreal Canadiens during the 1929–30 NHL season.

See also
List of players who played only one game in the NHL

External links
Gravestone of Edward K. "Mickey" Murray

1898 births
1978 deaths
Canadian ice hockey goaltenders
Sportspeople from Peterborough, Ontario
Kansas City Greyhounds players
Montreal Canadiens players
Philadelphia Arrows players
Providence Reds players
St. Louis Flyers players
Ice hockey people from Ontario